Anceya is a genus of tropical freshwater snails with an operculum, aquatic gastropod mollusks in the family Paludomidae.

The name Anceya is in honor of César Marie Félix Ancey.

This genus is endemic to Lake Tanganyika.

Species
This genus includes the following two species:
 Anceya giraudi Bourguignat, 1885 - type species
 Anceya terebriformis (Smith, 1890)

References

Further reading 
 Mandahl-Barth G. (1954). "The anatomy and systematic position of the Tanganyikan snails Syrnolopsis and Anceya". Annales du Musée Royal du Congo Belge, 4°, Sciences Zoologiques 1: 217-221.

Paludomidae
Taxonomy articles created by Polbot